Constantine Makris A.S.C. is a Greek-American cinematographer, television director and television producer who has mainly worked on Dick Wolf's series. For his work on Law & Order, he won Emmys for Outstanding Cinematography, Single Camera Series in 1993, 1997 and 1998.

Selected televisionography

As director
Manifest
Instinct
Ten Days in the Valley
The Lizzie Borden Chronicles
Orange Is the New Black
Law & Order
Law & Order: Special Victims Unit
Law & Order: Criminal Intent
Law & Order: Trial by Jury
Law & Order: Los Angeles
Conviction
30 Rock
Damages
Warehouse 13
FlashForward
Royal Pains
Rescue Me
Quantico
Chicago Fire
Chicago P.D. (not accredited)
Chicago Med (not accredited)

As cinematographer
Tracey Ullman Takes on New York
Law & Order

As producer
Conviction

References

External links

American television directors
Place of birth missing (living people)
Year of birth missing (living people)
American cinematographers
Living people
American people of Greek descent